Hongkongese Americans (Cantonese: 美籍香港人), include Americans who are also Hong Kong permanent residents who identify themselves as Hongkongers (who see Hong Kong as their home and are culturally associated with Hong Kong, especially through descent, growth, birth, long term residence in Hong Kong, or other types of deep affiliations with Hong Kong), Americans of Hong Kong ancestry (inhabitants of the New Territories), and also Americans who have Hong Kong parents. 

Hong Kong is a special administrative region of China and before that it was a British colony from 1841 until the Transfer of sovereignty to China in 1997.

Many of the Hong Kong Americans hold both United States citizenship and right of abode in Hong Kong. Other than the US passport, many of them also hold a HKSAR Passport or the British National (Overseas) passport.

Most of Hong Kong Americans were born in Hong Kong, United States, or Guangdong.

History
After the passage of the Immigration and Nationality Act of 1965, an influx of Cantonese-speaking Hong Kong immigrants settled in Chinatown, San Francisco, California, Chinatown, Los Angeles, California, and Chinatown, Manhattan, New York. In Chinatown neighborhoods, many Hong Kong immigrants opened businesses such as Chinese restaurants and supermarkets.

During the 1980s and the 1990s, a large number of high-skilled Hong Kong immigrants settled in the San Francisco Bay Area, where many were employed by high-technology companies in Silicon Valley. Many of the Hong Kong immigrants in the Bay Area resided in suburban communities, such as Burlingame, South San Francisco, San Mateo, Fremont, and in the Richmond District and Sunset District in San Francisco.  Many also settled in the New York Metropolitan area.

Many Hong Kong immigrants also immigrated to Greater Los Angeles's San Gabriel Valley in the 1980s and 1990s, most of them settling in Monterey Park, Alhambra, San Gabriel, Temple City, and Rosemead.

Population
As of 2012, there are 219,231 people in the United States who are born in Hong Kong. 96,281 of people born in Hong Kong live in the state of California. 39,523 of the people born in Hong Kong live in New York. New Jersey, Texas and Washington have 9,487, 8,671, and 8,191 Hong Kong-born residents, respectively. There is also a sizable community of Hong Kongers in the Greater Boston Area, especially in Quincy, Massachusetts. Massachusetts has 7,464 residents who were born in Hong Kong. All these numbers would have excluded those who were born elsewhere than Hong Kong (mainly the United States or Guangdong, China) as well as their descendants.

Notable people 

 Nathan Adrian – swimmer and Olympic medal winner
 Celia Au – actress and filmmaker 
 Jin Au-Yeung, professionally known as "MC Jin" – rapper, songwriter, actor, comedian
 Brian Burrell – actor
 Flora Chan – TVB actress
 Francis Chan – preacher
 Jaycee Chan – singer, film actor
 Melissa Chan – journalist
 John S. Chen – CEO of BlackBerry
 Kevin Cheng – TVB actor
 Amy Chow – gymnast and Olympic medal winner
 Denny Chin – judge of the United States District Court for the Southern District of New York (1994–present), first Asian American appointed as a United States district court judge 
 Margaret Chin – member of the New York City Council representing Chinatown
 Khalil Fong – singer-songwriter 
 The Fung Brothers – comedy and hip hop duo
 James Hong – actor
 William Hung – singer
 Yuet Wai Kan – pioneer in the use of DNA to diagnose human diseases; helped set the stage for the Human Genome Project
 Michelle Kwan – Olympic medal winner, ice skater
 Nancy Kwan – actress and model
 Kent Lai – tenured full professor, University of Utah School of Medicine
 Brandon Lee – martial artist and actor
 Bruce Lee – martial artist and actor
 Justin Lo – Cantopop singer-songwriter
 Byron Mann – actor
 Jimmy O. Yang – comedian
 Robin Shou – actor, martial artist and stuntman
 Harry Shum Jr. – actor
 Vivienne Tam – fashion designer
 Sam Tsui – musician, singer-songwriter and an Internet celebrity through YouTube
 Margaret W. Wong – Hong Kong-born naturalized American immigration attorney
 Daniel Wu – actor
 Wayne Wang – film director
 Martin Yan - chef and food writer

References 

 
 
Culture of Hong Kong